Lansing Ignite FC was a professional soccer team based in Lansing, Michigan, United States. The club began play in the newly-formed USL League One in 2019 and ceased operations following their inaugural season.

History 
The formation of USL League One (originally announced as USL Division III) was first announced in April 2017, and league officials began touring the country looking for candidate cities for new soccer clubs. The city of Lansing was already home to Lansing United, an amateur soccer team in the National Premier Soccer League. In 2018, United moved from NPSL to the Premier Development League, another amateur league often considered the fourth tier of American soccer. The move was seen as a step towards establishing a professional team, as the PDL is managed by United Soccer Leagues, the same organization that manages League One as well as the second-tier United Soccer League.

In September 2018, the Lansing State Journal reported that the owners of the Lansing Lugnuts, a local minor league baseball team, had presented plans to Lansing City Council for a professional soccer team to play at Cooley Law School Stadium, also home to the Lugnuts. On October 8, the city council unanimously approved the plans, which are expected to cost the city $1 million over the course of a five-year contract. This also signaled the end of the Lansing United men's team, as United owner Jeremy Sampson became the new club's general manager; however, Lansing United Women would continue to operate as planned.

On October 25, 2018, USL League One officially announced Lansing Ignite FC as its ninth founding member team, to begin play in 2019. On November 14, 2018, Lansing Ignite FC announced Nate Miller as the inaugural head coach. On March 19, 2019, Lansing Ignite FC announced an affiliation agreement with Chicago Fire of Major League Soccer.

Lansing played their first USL League One match on 30 March 2019, beating Richmond Kickers 3–2 at City Stadium, Richmond. Lansing finished their first season with a 12–6–10 record, good for second place in USL League One. They fell in the playoff semifinal to Greenville Triumph SC, 1–0. On October 14, 2019, midfielder Marshall Hollingsworth posted on Instagram that the Ignite would be folding and that all players had been released from their contracts. Team President Nick Grueser said that the team would not give an update on the team's future until after the conclusion of the League One final.

On October 21, 2019, it was officially announced by USL League One that, despite a successful first season performance-wise, the Ignite would not be returning for the 2020 season.

Sponsorship

2019

First team roster

Coaching staff

Non-competitive

Preseason friendlies

Midseason friendlies

Competitive

USL League One

Standings

Results summary

Results by round

Results

USL League One Playoffs

U.S. Open Cup

Final roster

Final team roster
As of January 10, 2019.

Year-by-year

1. Top Scorer includes statistics from league matches only.

Head coaches
 Includes USL Regular Season, USL Playoffs, U.S. Open Cup. Excludes friendlies.

Average attendance

References

External links 
 

 
Association football clubs established in 2018
2018 establishments in Michigan
Sports in Lansing, Michigan
Soccer clubs in Michigan
USL League One teams
Association football clubs disestablished in 2019
2019 disestablishments in Michigan